The Saint George's Monastery in Al-Khader or Church of Saint George in Al-Khader is an Eastern Orthodox Christian monastery in the Palestinian town of al-Khader, near Beit Jala and Bethlehem in the central West Bank. The town of Al-Khader is named after Saint George, who in Arab culture is known as "al-Khadr"; the church is considered the most important sanctuary to Khadr in Palestine.

According to local tradition, Saint George was imprisoned in the town of al-Khader where the current church stands. The chains holding him were relics that were said to hold healing power.

History

Crusader/Ayyubid and Mamluk periods
In the thirteenth century, an anonymous Greek text noted: ‘After Bait Jala, there is to be seen the church of the Great George; and in it is kept the chain that was laid on his back’.

Around 1421/1422 the Church of St. George was mentioned by Western traveler John Poloner as situated on a hill near Bethlehem.
In 1480 Felix Fabri noted: "At the side of this church there was once a great and fair monastery of Greek monks, but now it has been laid in ruins, and their remains only a little hovel, leaning against the church, wherein two Greek monks dwell."

Ottoman period
Around 1740, Richard Pococke still noted it as a Greek convent, but in 1838, when Edward Robinson passed, the former church had become a mosque.

In 1863, Victor Guérin noted "As for the convent or Deir ei-Khadher, it is not very considerable and does not seem so old. It is administered by a single religious Greek, assisted by two brothers and a few servants. A small number of narrow cells are reserved for foreigners. A solid, iron-clad door gives access to the interior of the cloister."

During the late 19th century, part of the convent were used for the mentally ill.

The modern church was built in 1912 but the remains of the chapel date back to the 16th century. The edifice has an Eastern Orthodox interior, and the dome contains a portrait of Christ Pantocrator.

Modern era
Since the priest in al-Khader was the only Christian inhabitant of the town, Saint George's Monastery attracted al-Khader's Muslims. During the Feast of Saint George in early June, the bridle of Saint George's horse would pass over the bodies of visitors to prevent or cure any mental illness, for which Saint George was renowned.

Gallery

See also
 Saint George: Devotions, traditions and prayers
 Feast of Saint George (Palestine)
 Saint George (disambiguation)
 Church of Saint George (Tulkarm)

References

Bibliography

External links
 Survey of Western Palestine, Map 17: IAA, Wikimedia commons

Eastern Orthodoxy in the State of Palestine
Religious buildings and structures completed in 1912
Christian monasteries in the West Bank
Al-Khader
Christian monasteries established in the 16th century
1912 establishments in the Ottoman Empire